Święcianowo is a village in the administrative district of Gmina Malechowo, within Sławno County, West Pomeranian Voivodeship, in north-western Poland.

The village has a population of 210.

History
For the history of the region, see History of Pomerania.

The modern settlement of was founded in the final quarter of the eighteenth century from Segenthin (since 1945 known by its polish name as Żegocino).  Segenthin was at that time held by Carl Caspar von Kleist (1734–1808) who received a royal grant for the development of arable land, which he used to establish two farms and eight smallholdings.   After 1834 the place came under the control (Gutsherrschaft) of Wilhelm Heinrich Ernst Gustav von Blumenthal, and a period of economic revival followed as the rural economy recovered after the agricultural depression of the 1820s.

References

Villages in Sławno County